Delhi Public School situated on Mathura Road in New Delhi, India, is a private co-educational day and boarding school with 6500+ students. It is run by the Delhi Public School Society and is a member of the Indian Public School Conference. The school was founded in 1949 and was the first Delhi Public School. In 2019 the school completed its 70 years. The school's first principal was J.D Tytler in 1949. The foundation stone of the school building was laid in 1956 by S. Radhakrishnan, the then Vice President of India.

Education system
The school follows the Central Board of Secondary Education system.

In 2007 it was rated as the third 'most respected secondary school' in India in a survey conducted by the Indian Market Research Bureau (IMRB) for the Deccan Herald newspaper.

Notable alumni

Arts and entertainment

 Kabir Bedi, actor 
 Shibani Kashyap, singer
 Hasleen Kaur, Miss India, model and actress
 Vinod Khanna, actor
 Radhika Madan, actress
 Mini Mathur, actress
 Shriya Saran, actress
 Mallika Sherawat (aka Reema Lamba)

Business

Naveen Jindal: Jindal Group of Companies

Writers and fashion      

 Anurag Anand, author
 Rohit Bal, fashion designer 
 Anuja Chauhan, writer

National/political leaders

 Montek Singh Ahluwalia, Deputy Chairman of the Indian Planning Commission, Planning Commission chairman of the Y2K Action Force
 Salman Khurshid, Union corporate affairs minister, politician, lawyer and writer 
 Raveesh Kumar, IFS officer currently serving as the Indian Ambassador to Finland and Estonia. Formerly the Official Spokesperson for the Ministry of External Affairs.

Sports

 Yuki Bhambri, tennis player
 Pawan Negi, cricketer

References

External links
  – Official website

Educational institutions established in 1949
Schools in Delhi
Delhi Public School Society
1949 establishments in India